Maureen Connolly defeated Louise Brough in the final, 7–5, 6–3 to win the ladies' singles tennis title at the 1952 Wimbledon Championships. Doris Hart was the defending champion, but lost in the quarterfinals to Pat Todd.

Seeds

  Doris Hart (quarterfinals)
  Maureen Connolly (champion)
  Shirley Fry (semifinals)
  Louise Brough (final)
  Pat Todd (semifinals)
  Jean Walker-Smith (quarterfinals)
  Thelma Long (quarterfinals)
  Jean Rinkel-Quertier (quarterfinals)

Draw

Finals

Top half

Section 1

Section 2

Section 3

Section 4

Bottom half

Section 5

Section 6

Section 7

Section 8

References

External links

Women's Singles
Wimbledon Championship by year – Women's singles
Wimbledon Championships
Wimbledon Championships